Henry Wensley (19 June 1893 – 1959) was an English footballer who played in the Football League for Durham City and Hartlepools United.

References

1893 births
1959 deaths
English footballers
Association football forwards
English Football League players
Shildon A.F.C. players
Stanley United F.C. players
Darlington F.C. players
Bishop Auckland F.C. players
Durham City A.F.C. players
Hartlepool United F.C. players